Let It Be Morning is a 2021 Palestinian drama film directed by Eran Kolirin, based on the Hebrew-language novel Let It Be Morning by Palestinian author Sayed Kashua. 

The cast is predominately Palestinian and most of the language is Arabic.

In June 2021, the film was selected to compete in the Un Certain Regard section at the 2021 Cannes Film Festival. The Palestinian cast opposed the classification of the film as "Israeli," and withdrew from the Cannes Film Festival in protest. Israel selected the film as its entry for the Best International Feature Film at the 94th Academy Awards.

Plot
Let It Be Morning is the story of Sami (Alex Bakri) a Palestinian-born Israeli citizen living in Jerusalem who is invited to his brother’s wedding. He has to  return to the Arab village where he grew up and which he left for other opportunities. After the wedding ends, Sami's hometown is put under a military blockade lockdown by the Israeli government, without explanation. The power is cut and the villagers are trapped by an Israeli roadblock. 

When chaos erupts amongst the villagers who begin to run out of food and water, Sami is also cut off from the outside world and unable to return to his work in Jerusalem. Trapped in an unexpected situation, he deals with questions about his own identity. As hidden secrets are revealed, Sami watches everything he holds dear begin to fall apart. 

Written and directed by award-winning Israeli filmmaker Eran Kolirin (The Band's Visit), the film was adapted from the international best-selling novel of the same name  by Palestinian author Sayed Kashua. 

Let It Be Morning is a film about a state of siege, both internal and external – centered around a man who has built a wall around his heart. It explores how that inner wall starts coming apart when a physical wall is erected around his hometown.

Cast
 Alex Bakri as Sami
 Juna Suleiman as Mira
 Salim Dau as Tarek
 Ehab Salami as Abed
 Khalifa Natour as Mohammed
 Samer Bisharat as Aziz
 Yara Elham Jarrar as Lina
 Izabel Ramadan as Zahera
 Doraid Liddawi as Nabil
 Maruan Hamdan as Adam
 Arin Saba as Rola
 Nadib Spadi as Ashraf

Release
Cohen Media Group, the US distributors of the film, released Let It Be Morning in the United States on February 3, 2023.

Reception

 

Davide Abbatescianni, of The New Arab, defined it as "an enjoyable comedy," although "it occasionally suffers from some pacing issues, especially during its last third." He praised its "solid storytelling, the good acting performances and the compelling lead character."

See also
 List of submissions to the 94th Academy Awards for Best International Feature Film
 List of Israeli submissions for the Academy Award for Best International Feature Film

References

External links
 

2021 films
2021 drama films
Israeli drama films
2020s Hebrew-language films
Films directed by Eran Kolirin